The 1965 Orange Bowl, part of the 1964–65 bowl season, was the 31st edition of the college football bowl game, played at the Orange Bowl in Miami, Florida, on Friday, January 1. Texas built an early lead and 

This was the first Orange Bowl game played at night, and the first live national network telecast of a college football game during prime time.
NBC acquired the television rights and the kickoff was moved to follow the network's Rose Bowl telecast, without competition from other bowls. It also was the first Orange Bowl in twelve years not to include a team from the Big Eight Conference.

Teams

Alabama

Alabama finished the regular season as both SEC and national champions with a record  During the Iron Bowl, Alabama accepted a bid to play in the Orange Bowl from bowl officials. It was fourth Orange Bowl appearance for Alabama and their 18th bowl game. With USC upsetting Notre Dame 20–17 on the final weekend of the season, Alabama was selected as the 1964 national champions by both final major polls, released prior to

Texas

The defending national champion Longhorns finished the regular season with a  Only  loss against Arkansas in week five kept the Longhorns from repeating as national champions.

Game summary
After the defense stopped Alabama at the one-yard line on fourth down, Texas responded quickly with the first score of the evening. After moving the ball 20 yards, Longhorn running back Ernie Koy took the ball 79-yards for a 7–0 Texas lead with only :23 remaining in the first quarter. Texas extended their lead to 14–0 on their next offensive possession when George Sauer caught a 69-yard touchdown reception from Jim Hudson. Alabama cut the lead in half later in the second quarter when Joe Namath hit Wayne Trimble for a 7-yard touchdown reception. On the following possession, Alabama blocked a 35-yard David Conway field goal attempt, recovered the ball, but fumbled it on the return, which Texas recovered. Ernie Koy capped the ensuing 38-yard drive with a two-yard touchdown run to give the Longhorns a 21–7 lead 

In the second half, Texas was held scoreless, but Alabama was unable to take the lead with only ten additional points. The first score was a 20-yard Ray Perkins touchdown reception from Namath and the second on a 26-yard David Ray field goal early in the fourth quarter. Although on the losing side, Alabama quarterback Namath was selected as the game's outstanding player for completing 18 of 37 passes for 255 yards and a pair of touchdowns.

Scoring

Statistics
{| class=wikitable style="text-align:center"
! Statistics !! Texas !! Alabama
|-
|First Downs || 15|| 18
|-
|Rushes–yards|| 51–212|| 26–49
|-
|Passing yards|| 101|| 298
|-
|Passes (C–A–I)|| 4–17–1 || 20–44–2
|-
|Total Offense || 68–313 || 70–347
|-
|Punts–average ||9–36.8|| 5–3.4
|-
|Fumbles–lost ||2–1|| 3–1
|-
|Turnovers|| 2 || 3 
|-
|Penalties–yards ||3–25|| 4–46
|}

Aftermath
The following day, Namath signed his record contract with the New York Jets of the American Football League (AFL), estimated at $400,000 over 

Both final polls were released at the end of the regular season, prior to the bowls.

References

1964–65 NCAA football bowl games
1965
1965
1965
Orange Bowl
January 1965 sports events in the United States